Ho'okena is a Hawaiian music trio which consist of the members Horace K. Dudoit, Chris Kamaka and Glen Smith. The group was created in 1986 and remains one of the longest lasting Hawaiian music groups. Ho'okena has been nominated for the Grammy Awards three times and has won multiple Na Hoku Hanohano Awards.

Music career 

Ho'okena has performed at the world renowned Carnegie Hall twice. Ho'okena has released twelve music albums. In 2008 the group had the opportunity to perform for then-President of the United States Barack Obama and then-First Lady Michelle Obama along with Hawaiian Musicians Raiatea Helm and Willie K. In 2015 Ho'okena recorded a song with country superstar Josh Turner on his album Deep South (Josh Turner album) titled "Hawaiian Girl." In 2018 Horace K. Dudoit and Glen Smith performed at the Merrie Monarch Festival for Kumu Hula Robert Cazimero of The Brothers Cazimero. Cazimero promised to showcase a group of "A+ musicians."

In 2018, Ho'okena and Moon Kauakahi, who was formerly in the band Mākaha Sons,  was featured on Kalani Pe'a's sophomore album. Pe'a's album "No 'Ane'i" went on to win a Grammy Award in 2019 under the Best Regional Roots Music Album category.

Discography

Albums 
 2020: Meant To Be
 2017: Ho‘okena 3.0
 2012: Huliau
 2009: Nani Mau Loa - Everlasting Beauty
 2005: Treasure II: Lei Pūlamahia
 2003: Cool Elevation
 2001: Treasure
 2000: Home for the Holidays
 1999: Ho'okena 5
 1996: Ho‘okamaha‘o
 1993: Nā Kai Ewalu
 1991: Choice of the Heart
 1990: Thirst Quencher!

Music awards

Nā Hōkū Hanohano Awards 
Ho'okena has won seven Na Hoku Hanohano Awards.
 1991: Thirst Quencher! - Most Promising Artist
 1991: Thirst Quencher! - Group Of The Year
 1991: Thirst Quencher! - Traditional Hawaiian Album Of The Year 
 2000: Ho‘okena 5 - Hawaiian Language Performance 
 2001: Home for the Holidays - Christmas Album Of The Year
 2010: Nani Mau Loa - Everlasting Beauty - Hawaiian Language Performance
 2010: Nani Mau Loa - Everlasting Beauty - Group Of The Year

Grammy Awards 
Ho'okena has been nominated for a Grammy Award three times.

 2004: Cool Elevation - Best Hawaiian Music Album (Nominee)
 2009: Nani Mau Loa: Everlasting Beauty - Best Hawaiian Music Album (Nominee)
 2018: Ho'okena 3.0 - Best Regional Roots Music Album (Nominee)

References 

Musical groups from Hawaii
1986 establishments in Hawaii
Na Hoku Hanohano Award winners
Musical groups established in 1986
American musical trios